was a monthly Japanese  manga magazine published by Hakusensha. A sister magazine to Young Animal, it was released on the first Friday of every month in B5 format from 2000 to 2018.

Series featured in the magazine
The following is a partial list of the artists and manga serialized in the magazine:

 Hikari Asada (story), Maru Asakura (art)
 14 Juicy
 Kanji Kawashima
 Anko Bomb-a-Yeah!!
 Serika Himuro
 Aoi no Yuuwaku
 Ichiro Sasaki (story), Kazuo Maekawa (art)
 Crack Hound
 Takakazu Nagakubo (story), Tsuyoshi Masuda (art)
 Ecchi no Kamisama!
 Miyakuji Otoshi
 Katsu Aki
 Futari Ecchi 
 Fumihiro Hayashizaki
 Gabumento
 Jun Fujishima
 Ginburu Taiheiki
 Hitoshi Iwaaki
 Heureka
 GoDo (story), TAGRO (art)
 Himawari Den!
 Rei Nakajima
 Inumimi
 Nurse Witch Komugi-chan Magikarte
 Yumi Unita
 Kiki
 Kenjiro Kawatsu
 Koibana Onsen
 Takeshi Matsumoto
 Magical Strawberry
 Junya Takeuchi
 Miko Shimai
 Maru Asakura
 Mugen Shoujo
 Ryuta Amazume
 Nana to Kaoru
 Toshiue no Hito
 Shigemitsu Harada (story), Takahiro Seguchi (art)
 My Balls
 Shizuya Wazarai
 Kentō Shitō Den Cestvs (2014–2018) moved to Manga Park
 Tomohiro Takashima
 Panda Zuke
 LINDA
 Seki-la-la Kanojo
 Hideaki Nishikawa
 Shokugyo Koroshiya
 Apocrypha Getter Robot Dash
 Mahiru Teku
 Zenbu, Kimi no Sei da

References

External links
  
 

2000 establishments in Japan
2018 disestablishments in Japan
Defunct magazines published in Japan
Hakusensha magazines
Magazines established in 2000
Magazines disestablished in 2018
Magazines published in Tokyo
Monthly manga magazines published in Japan
Seinen manga magazines